Don't Wait for the Movie is the fourth album by the Christian rock band White Heart and the band's first album with vocalist Rick Florian and drummer Chris McHugh. It is also their first album on Sparrow Records. Bassist Gary Lunn would leave the group after the release of the album and was replace on tour by bass guitar player and musician Tommy Sims. Sims would be a featured member and musician on their next album. Don't Wait for the Movie became a very successful album with radio singles "How Many Times (Seventy Times Seven)" and "Fly Eagle Fly" both topping the Christian radio charts while "Beat of a Different Drum" and "Dr. Jekyll and Mr. Christian" were hits on Christian Rock radio stations and programs. CCM Magazine named this album as one of the 100 Greatest Albums in Christian Music at number 74. Don't Wait for the Movie peaked at number 11 on the Billboard Top Inspirational Albums chart. White Heart was nominated for Group of the Year at the 18th GMA Dove Awards but lost to First Call. The album cover did win a Dove Award for Recorded Music Packaging given to Mark Tucker and Buddy Jackson for photography and art direction.

White Heart also released a companion video called Don't Wait for the Movie: The Live Video Album on VHS featuring all songs on the album except "King George."

Track listing
 "Read the Book (Don't Wait for the Movie)" (Smiley, Kennedy, Mo West) – 4:51 
 "Holy Ground" (Smiley, Kennedy, Gersmehl) – 4:42
 "Beat of a Different Drum" (Smiley, Kennedy, McHugh, Gersmehl) – 4:17	
 "Fly Eagle Fly" (Smiley, Kennedy, Gersmehl) – 4:41
 "Convertibles" (Smiley, Kennedy, Gersmehl) – 3:43
 "Let the Children Play (Instrumental)" (Kennedy, Larry Stewart) – 1:32
 "King George" (Smiley, Kennedy, Gersmehl) – 4:20
 "No Apology" (Smiley, Kennedy, Gersmehl) – 4:22 
 "Maybe Today" (Smiley, Kennedy, Gersmehl) – 4:25
 "Dr. Jekyll and Mr. Christian" (Smiley, Kennedy, Gersmehl) – 4:34
 "How Many Times (Seventy Times Seven)" (Gersmehl) – 4:27

Critical reception 
Evan Cater of AllMusic said Don't Wait for the Movies "songs are founded on some thuddingly obvious lyrical conceit. The too-clever title track, 'Read the Book (Don't Wait for the Movie),' sets the tone with its criticism of modern media-obsessed culture: "I asked them if they knew Jesus/'Is He in a theater near you?'/I said, 'no, He's the Messiah'/'Do you think He'll get good reviews?'" Another blatant gimmick is used on 'Convertibles,' which makes the theologically questionable assertion that "God made convertibles." (No, it's not meant metaphorically.) 'King George' takes a similar approach in suggesting that Americans are giving up the religious freedoms earned in the Revolutionary War: "Now we're so free, but tell me what's our freedom for/If we say His name, if our message gets too strong/the radio will never play this song." Of course, White Heart's beef doesn't make a lot of sense. The reason explicitly Christian music is rarely heard on mainstream radio is not because of any restriction of religious freedom, but because a large percentage of the mainstream audience is not devoutly Christian. The founding fathers never promised that freedom of worship would ensure popular acceptance of Christian beliefs."

Over at Cross Rhythms, Mike Rimmer gave the album 8 out of 10 saying "the new line up managed a more sophisticated sound with this release, combing some slightly edgier rock tunes with some smooth '80s rock ballads. It's all very AOR but there's plenty to enjoy like the driving rock of 'Holy Ground,' 'Read The Book' and 'Dr. Jekyll And Mr. Christian.' There's some good '80s pop as evidenced by 'No Apology' and on the ballad, 'Fly Eagle Fly.' Modern rock this isn't but if you were there, it's likely you look back on this album with a certain amount of nostalgia. It's the sound of a CCM band rising to new heights."

 Personnel White Heart Ric Florian – lead vocals
 Mark Gersmehl – keyboards, trombone, vocals
 Billy Smiley – keyboards, guitars, trumpet, vocals 
 Gordon Kennedy – lead guitars, sitar, vocals 
 Gary Lunn – bass guitar, LinnDrum programming
 Chris McHugh – drums, percussionAdditional musicians Tommy Greer – keyboard programming
 Farrell Morris – percussion on "Read the Book (Don't Wait for the Movie)"Production Billy Smiley – producer, editing
 White Heart – producers
 Brent King – engineer, mixing
 David Pierce – second engineer
 Ken Love – editing
 Hank Williams – mastering
 Buddy Jackson – art direction
 Mike Drake – artwork
 Jim Shanman – design
 Mark Tucker – photographyStudios Center Stage Studio, Nashville, Tennessee - recording studio, overdub location
 MasterMix, Nashville, Tennessee - mixing location, editing location, mastering location

 Charts 

Radio singles

AccoladesGMA Dove Awards'

References

1986 albums
White Heart albums